Tamika Domrow  (born 6 September 1989) is an Australian synchronized swimmer. She competed in the 2008 Summer Olympics, where her team finished seventh and the 2012 Summer Olympics, where Australia finished in eighth.

Personal
Domrow was born on 6 September 1989 in Brisbane and is from Camp Mountain. She attended Samford State School and St Paul's School, Bald Hills. She  has a Certificate in Companion Animal Services. , she lives in Brisbane and works for Samford Pet Resort as an apprentice kennel technician.  Her employer accommodated her training schedule.

Tamika is married to Mathew Glover.

Synchronized swimming
Domrow is a synchronized swimmer, taking up the sport at the Valley Pool in Brisbane when she was ten years old. In 2008, she was a member of Neptunes Synchronised Swimming Club.  a member of the Gold Coast Mermaids. She was coached by Mike Burgess.  Her former coach died in July 2008, not long before the 2008 Games.  She has been coached by Marina Kholod since 2005.

Domrow broke into Australia's senior national team when she was fifteen years old. In 2007, she competed at the FINA world championships in the team event.  The ten person team was the first Australian one to make it in the finals for the synchronised swimming free combination routine.

Domrow competed at the 2008 Summer Olympics as an eighteen-year-old. Her team came in seventh. Prior to going to Beijing, she participated in a ten-day training camp at the Melbourne Sports and Aquatic Centre.  Following the Beijing Games, she retired from the sport for eighteen months.

Domrow and Jenny-Lyn Anderson competed in the Open Free Duet at the 2011 National Championships, coming away with a fourth-place finish. In 2012, she competed with the national team at events in Perth, Spain and New Caledonia.

Domrow  was selected to represent Australia at the 2012 Summer Olympics in synchronized swimming. She qualified for the Olympics as a member of the national team at the 2011 World Championships in Shanghai.  At her second Games, she will be twenty-two years old.  In preparation for the Games, she spent up to nine hours a day in the pool.

References

Living people
1989 births
Australian synchronised swimmers
Olympic synchronised swimmers of Australia
Synchronized swimmers at the 2008 Summer Olympics
Synchronized swimmers at the 2012 Summer Olympics
Sportswomen from Queensland
Swimmers from Brisbane